Spiceworld is the second studio album by English girl group the Spice Girls, released on 1 November 1997 by Virgin Records. Its music incorporates dance-pop music and production. The album became a commercial success worldwide, lengthening the so-called "Spicemania" of the time. It debuted at number one on the UK Albums Chart, with first-week sales of 190,000 copies and shipped 1.4 million copies in two weeks. The album also reached number one in 13 countries, while peaking inside the top three in Australia, Canada, France, Switzerland and the United States. Spiceworld has sold over 14 million copies worldwide, making it one of the world's best-selling albums by a girl group.

The album spawned four singles, all of which saw commercial success. Its lead single "Spice Up Your Life" became an international success, peaking in the top five positions in many countries. It was followed by the singles "Too Much", "Stop", and "Viva Forever", all of which attained commercial success on the charts. To promote the album, the Spice Girls embarked on their debut headlining concert tour, titled the Spiceworld Tour, covering Europe and North America for a total of 97 dates between February and September 1998. This is the last studio album with member Geri Halliwell who left during the tour, but came back in 2007.

A 25-track expanded version of Spiceworld was released on all digital platforms on 4 November 2022, celebrating 25 years since the album's original release. Previously commercially-unreleased single "Step to Me" was released digitally on the same day as the announcement. The physical issue, CDs, cassettes, limited edition hardbound book, are to be released 16 December 2022.

Background
After releasing their hugely successful debut album Spice, which later became one of the best-selling albums of all time, the group announced they were working on a second studio album. During the recording and writing of Spiceworld the group also filmed Spice World, a musical comedy film starring the Spice Girls as themselves. The album worked as a soundtrack to the film, with most of the songs from the album appearing in the film, with the exception of "Move Over".

Throughout 1997, the Spice Girls received massive media attention, which also included a few controversies. The group performed live for the first time for the British royal family. At the show, they breached royal protocol when Mel B and then Geri Halliwell planted kisses on Prince Charles's cheeks and pinched his bottom. The group was also criticised in the United States for releasing their second album Spiceworld just nine months after the American release of their debut album Spice. They received further criticism because of the impact and amount of sponsorship deals they had signed. They also made a decision to fire their manager Simon Fuller in November 1997, which was front-page news around the world.

In October 1997, the Spice Girls held a two-date concert in Istanbul named Girl Power! Live in Istanbul, sponsored by Pepsi. During the concert the group premiered three new songs from Spiceworld: "Too Much", "Stop" and "Saturday Night Divas". Two promotional singles from Spiceworld were released prior to the album release in 1997; "Step to Me" and "Move Over (Generation Next)". Both songs were used in the Pepsi advertising campaigns and were also given away free with special ring-pulls. The Japanese album version of "Step to Me" is slightly different from the original release of the song, while "Move Over (Generation Next)" was only released as a live version during its promotional release.

Composition

The album consists of pop music with dance-pop songs and production. According to AllMusic, the album's music is "catchier" and has an "intoxicating sense of fun". The album was also used as the soundtrack to their 1997 film Spice World. "Spice Up Your Life" is an uptempo dance-pop song, with influences of Latin rhythms such as salsa and samba. The first verse follows, the lyrics are an international rally cry, targeted to a global market, as Melanie C described it: "We always wanted to do a carnival tune and write a song for the world." "Stop" is an uptempo dance-pop song with influences of Motown's blue-eyed soul, and is reminiscent of classic singles by The Supremes or Martha and the Vandellas. Lyrically, the song calls for a slowing down on the courtship process, and it is particularly addressed to appeal to the young female audience, as the female to female bonds are not threatened. "Too Much" is a pop ballad, with influences of R&B music and doo-wop sounds. whereas "Never Give Up on the Good Times" is a dance-pop song with influences of disco. "Viva Forever" is a pop ballad with influences of Latin music. "The Lady Is a Vamp" has influences of jazz.

Critical reception

Spiceworld received positive reviews from music critics. Stephen Thomas Erlewine from AllMusic wrote that the album "boast[s] a more consistent (and catchier) set of songs [than Spice] and an intoxicating sense of fun", concluding that "each song has a strong melody and a strong, solid beat, whether it's a ballad or a dance number. It's a pure, unadulterated guilty pleasure and some of the best manufactured mainstream dance-pop of the late '90s." David Browne from Entertainment Weekly stated, "Trading verses in this and other songs, they transform the numbers into audio pajama parties full of sisterly advice, support, and warnings. Part heart, part mind, all cotton candy, Spiceworld may just be the answer to one of life's most vexing quandaries."

Rolling Stones David Wild commented that, compared to Spice, Spiceworld is "a masterful effort; at its best, it reaches creative heights that are downright Bananaramian." In a mixed review, Craig D. Lindsey of the Houston Press expressed, "Anyone expecting a maelstrom of artistic evolution from these women ought to relax a little; it's only music, for chrissakes. And the Spice Girls and their handlers deserve bonus points for showing a little common sense. After all, if this were seven years ago, they might have taken their precious time releasing Spiceworld, while the group's hype was irreversibly extinguished."

Commercial performance
Spiceworld debuted at number one on the UK Albums Chart, selling 192,000 copies and shipping 1.4 million copies in its first week. The album was certified five-times platinum by the British Phonographic Industry (BPI) on 19 December 1997, and had sold 1,603,426 copies in the United Kingdom as of October 2019. The album reached number one in several European countries, including Austria, Denmark, Finland, Ireland, the Netherlands and Norway. It was certified five-times platinum by the International Federation of the Phonographic Industry (IFPI), denoting sales in excess of five million copies across Europe. In Japan, Spiceworld peaked at number six on the Oricon Albums Chart and earned a double platinum certification from the Recording Industry Association of Japan (RIAJ). In Oceania, the album reached number two in Australia and number one in New Zealand; it was ceritifed six-times platinum by the Australian Recording Industry Association (ARIA) and triple platinum by the Recording Industry Association of New Zealand (RIANZ).

The album debuted at number eight on the US Billboard 200 with first-week sales of 83,000 copies. Sales increased week by week, its best week being that of 3 January 1998 when it sold 284,000 copies. The album finally peaked at number three on 14 February, when Spice also returned to the top 10, making the Spice Girls the first British band to have two albums in the top 10 of the Billboard 200 at the same time since the Rolling Stones in summer 1975. The album sold 1.74 million copies in the first 12 weeks and 3.2 million in the first 10 months. It was certified four-times platinum by the Recording Industry Association of America (RIAA) on 19 May 1999, and by December 2007, it had sold 4.2 million copies in the US. In Canada, the album peaked at number two on the Canadian Albums Chart and was certified diamond by the Canadian Recording Industry Association (CRIA) for shipments of one million copies. Spiceworld was a big success in Canada, it was the group's second diamond-selling album and spent 43 weeks in the Top 10 and 60 weeks in the Top 20 album chart. Spiceworld had sold 13 million copies by the end of 1998, making it one of the world's best-selling albums by a girl group.

Singles
"Spice Up Your Life" was released as the lead single from the album on 13 October 1997. The song became an instant worldwide success, although it received negative reviews from music critics. In the United Kingdom, the song peaked at number one, becoming the group's fifth consecutive chart-topper, and was certified platinum by the BPI. "Spice Up Your Life" reached the top five in over 14 countries, while reaching number 18 on the Billboard Hot 100 in the United States.

The album's second single, "Too Much", was released on 15 December 1997 and hit number one in the UK, becoming the group's second consecutive Christmas number-one single. The song was certified platinum in the UK. In the US, "Too Much" peaked at number nine on the Billboard Hot 100, their fourth and so far last top-10 single there. The song also peaked at number nine in Australia, New Zealand, and Canada.

The third single from Spiceworld was "Stop". Critically, the song received mainly positive reviews from music critics, mostly praising the Motown-inspired music and production. It was released on 9 March 1998 and peaked at number two in the United Kingdom, ending the Spice Girls' streak of consecutive number-one singles on the UK chart at six. The single received a silver certification. In the US the song reached peaked at number 16 on the Hot 100. Elsewhere, "Stop" reached the top 10 in nine other countries.

The fourth and final single from the album was intended to be a double A-side release of "Never Give Up on the Good Times" and "Viva Forever". However, due to Halliwell's departure from the group, the plan was scrapped. Instead, "Viva Forever" was released alone on 20 July 1998. The song received critical acclaim from critics, as some called it "genuine". "Viva Forever" reached number one in the United Kingdom and was certified platinum by the BPI. The song debuted at number one in New Zealand, becoming the band's first chart-topper in that country since "Wannabe". "Viva Forever" did not receive a single release in the United States.

Promotion

Live performances

The Spice Girls performed "Spice Up Your Life" for the first time in the United Kingdom on 27 September 1997, on BBC's programme National Lottery, which attracted more than nine million viewers. The song was subsequently performed many times on television, in both Europe and the US, including An Audience with..., Top of the Pops, All That, The Jay Leno Show, Late Show with David Letterman, and The Oprah Winfrey Show. "Spice Up Your Life" was also performed in many award ceremonies such as the 1997 Smash Hits! Awards, the 1997 MTV Europe Music Awards, the 1997 Billboard Music Awards, the 1997 Premios Ondas, the 1997 Channel V Music Awards, and the 2000 Brit Awards. "Too Much" was performed several times on television, including An Audience with..., Top of the Pops, and the 1997 Royal Variety Performance. The group also performed it at the 1997 Smash Hits! Awards, and at the 25th Annual American Music Awards. "Stop" was also performed many times on television, in both the UK and the US, including An Audience with..., Top of the Pops, The Tonight Show with Jay Leno, and the Late Show with David Letterman. For their "Stop" performance at the 1998 Brit Awards, the group adopted a Supremes-like look, and appeared on the stage in a 1960-style car. The group performed "Stop" and "Viva Forever" without Halliwell in Modena, Italy; for the annually hosted Pavarotti & Friends charity concert in June 1998. "Viva Forever" was performed with Halliwell on Top of the Pops on 21 May 1998 and without her on 27 May 1998 at the National Lottery. In October 1997 the Spice Girls held a two-date concert on Abdi İpekçi Arena in Istanbul, Turkey, performing four songs of Spiceworld; "Spice Up Your Life, "Too Much, "Saturday Night Divas and "Stop". The performance was broadcast on Showtime in a pay-per-view event titled Spice Girls in Concert Wild!.

Concert tour
In early 1998, the Spice Girls embarked on their first world tour that Fuller had set up for them covering Europe and North America for 97 dates. The Spiceworld Tour kicked off in Dublin, Ireland, on 24 February 1998 before moving on to mainland Europe and then returning to the UK for two gigs at Wembley Arena and 12 gigs at Birmingham's NEC Arena. On 31 May 1998, Halliwell left the group during the tour's run. The remaining girls continued the tour to its last date without Halliwell. A VHS release of the group's performance at Wembley Stadium, titled Live at Wembley Stadium, was released on 24 November 1998.

Spiceworld25
On 27 September 2022, the Spice Girls announced the release date for Spiceworld25, the 25th anniversary edition of their 1997 album Spiceworld. and revealed the new 25-track tracklisting. The new collection features previously unreleased live versions and remixes, plus previously available B-sides "Walk of Life" and "Outer Space Girls" and a megamix. The anniversary had first been teased in July 2022, when they released an image of the Earth with a Spiceworld25 banner across it. Their 1997 song "Step to Me" was released digitally for the first time on the same day as the album announcement. "Step to Me" had originally been released in 1997 as part of a Pepsi promotion, where fans could get the single CD if they collected enough ring pulls. Spiceworld25 was released on 4 November 2022. On the same day, an official montage music video for "Never Give Up on the Good Times" was released, and was directed by Kiran Mistry. On 11 November 2022, Spiceworld25 charted at number 46 on the UK Albums Chart.

Track listing

Personnel
Credits adapted from the liner notes of Spiceworld.

Musicians

 Matt Rowe – keyboards, programming 
 Pete Davis – additional programming 
 Mike Higham – additional programming 
 Absolute – instruments 
 Kick Horns – brass 
 Milton McDonald – guitar ; additional guitar 
 Stephen Hussey – string arrangement 
 Pure Stringz – strings 
 Magnus Fiennes – additional programming ; additional keyboards 
 Steve Lewinson – bass guitar 
 Shawn Lee – guitar 
 Snake Davis – flute 
 Anne Dudley – string arrangement 
 Paul "Tubbs" Williams – bass 
 John Themis – acoustic guitar 
 Steve Sidwell – orchestral arrangement

Technical

 Richard Stannard – production 
 Matt Rowe – production 
 Adrian Bushby – recording, engineering 
 Mark "Spike" Stent – mixing
 Paul "P. Dub" Walton – mixing assistance 
 Jake Davies – additional engineering 
 Absolute – production 
 Jeremy Wheatley – engineering 
 Paul Hicks – engineering 
 Robbie Kazandjian – engineering assistance 
 Jan Kybert – mixing assistance ; engineering assistance 
 Mark Tucker – engineering 
 Steve Pelluet – engineering assistance

Charts

Weekly charts

Year-end charts

Decade-end charts

Certifications and sales

Release history

References

Bibliography

 
 
 
 
 

1997 albums
Albums produced by Richard Stannard (songwriter)
Spice Girls albums
Virgin Records albums